Submissions Only is a comedy web series about the casting and audition process for Broadway theater. It centers around aspiring actress Penny Reilly (Kate Wetherhead) and her friend, casting agency director Tim Trull (Colin Hanlon), and their circle of friends, colleagues, relationships and family. The series was created in August 2010 by Broadway performers Wetherhead and Andrew Keenan-Bolger. Wetherhead is the series' writer, while Keenan-Bolger is the main director and editor.

The series has had three seasons. The first season started airing in October 2010 and had six episodes, the second season started airing in September 2011 and had eight episodes, and the third season started airing in March 2014 and had eight episodes. Most episodes run between 15 and 20 minutes long. The first season was produced on a minuscule budget, and was shown on YouTube. The second and third seasons had significantly larger budget, and higher production quality. Episodes from the second and third seasons were originally shown exclusively on the website BroadwayWorld.com, which also partially funded the project, but were both eventually released on YouTube. Most of the funding for the second and third seasons was solicited through the website Kickstarter. Broadway producer Kevin McCollum was a producing partner for the third season.

Characters

Main
 Penny Reilly (Kate Wetherhead) – an aspiring Broadway actress who remains optimistic despite a variety of setbacks
 Tim Trull (Colin Hanlon) – the head of a casting agency, and Penny's best friend
 Steven Ferrell (Stephen Bienskie) – Penny's agent and Tim's ex-boyfriend
 Aaron Miller (Santino Fontana) – a talented but blasé actor, and Penny's occasional love interest
 Gail Liner (Lindsay Nicole Chambers) – Tim's secretary, who is disdainful of nearly everyone, including Tim
 Cameron Dante (Max von Essen) – a former actor and Steven's boyfriend (recurring first and second seasons, main third season)
 Linda Avery (Anne L. Nathan) – a lascivious director who doesn't realize that most of the men she flirts with are gay
 Serena Maxwell (Donna Vivino) – a Broadway star, and Aaron's girlfriend (recurring second season, main third season)
 Raina Pearl (Asmeret Ghebremichael) – Penny's roommate, also a Broadway actress (main first and second season, recurring third season)
 Randall Moody (Jared Gertner) – Tim's former reader, and an annoyingly enthusiastic Broadway-lover (recurring second season, guest third season)
 Nolan Grigsby (Wade McCollum) – an eccentric, independently wealthy director who has developed a compass-based theory of acting (recurring second season, main third season)
 Agnes Vetrulli (Marilyn Sokol) – a friendly but batty actress who replaces Randall as Tim's reader (main third season)

Recurring
 Eric Hennigan (Patrick Heusinger) – a strait-laced actor on whom Penny harbors a crush (first season only)
 Val Reilly (Beth Leavel) – Penny's mother, who is always saving magazine articles for Penny to read
 Don Martin (Rick Elice) – Penny's stepfather, who is always trying to hit on girls and get into the acting game
 Donny Rich (Andrew Keenan-Bolger) – a snobby casting assistant
 "Adorable Girl" (Annaleigh Ashford) – a bubbly actress who seems to know everyone and compliments people on how thin they look
 Andy Edmond (Jeffrey Kuhn) – a catty music director
 Rick Valencia (Kevin Pariseau) – a middle-aged actor who is very verbose about the audition process

Episodes

Season 1 (2010–2011)

Season 2 (2011–2012)
{| class="wikitable plainrowheaders" width="100%" style="margin-right: 0;"
|-
! style="background-color: #A42D22; color:#ffffff;"| #
! style="background-color: #A42D22; color:#ffffff;"| #
! style="background-color: #A42D22; color:#ffffff;"| Title
! style="background-color: #A42D22; color:#ffffff;"| Directed by
! style="background-color: #A42D22; color:#ffffff;"| Written by
! style="background-color: #A42D22; color:#ffffff;"| Length
! style="background-color: #A42D22; color:#ffffff;"| Release date
|-

{{Episode list
 |EpisodeNumber = 12
 |EpisodeNumber2 = 6
 |Title = Woof!
 |DirectedBy = Kate Wetherhead and Andrew Keenan-Bolger
 |WrittenBy = Kate Wetherhead
 |Aux3 = 20:43
 |OriginalAirDate = 
 |ShortSummary =   Iron Dog'''s New York opening night has received terrible reviews. Tim, Randall and Gail assist Nolan in auditions for his play, based on Nolan's "Compass-ition" theories. Penny and Raina go to an acting class where Serena is also present, and Serena is bereft due to the bad reviews. Penny and Tim attend an office promotion party for Steven, which Aaron also attends. Penny and Aaron, who realize neither one has seen the reviews yet, leave the party so they can finally read them.
 |LineColor = A42D22
}}

|}

Season 3 (2014)

Production
The impetus for the series was a series of backstage videos that Keenan-Bolger recorded for Music Theatre International, titled Keenan Blogger. Several of the videos were recorded while Keenan-Bolger was in the cast of a production of It's a Bird...It's a Plane...It's Superman in Dallas in 2010, and Wetherhead, who was also a cast member, assisted in their production. Wetherhead's husband, who was the show's lighting designer, suggested they create a web series together.

All of the audition material shown is from fake plays and musicals, with dialogue and lyrics written by Wetherhead. For musical numbers, the music was written by Adam Gwon, Adam Wachter, Keith Varney and others.

Most of the actors who have appeared on the series are Broadway performers who are friends and acquaintances of the creators.

CameosSubmissions Only has included cameos by Broadway veterans such as Chita Rivera, Kristin Chenoweth, Audra McDonald, Hunter Foster, Adam Pascal, Jeremy Jordan, Danny Burstein and Brian D'Arcy James, Kelli O'Hara, Heidi Blickenstaff, Lin-Manuel Miranda, actors such as Rachel Dratch, Kristen Johnston, Michael Urie, Bobby Cannavale and Judith Light, and New York Post theater critic Michael Riedel. The last episode of season two notably had a large number of cameos, including appearances by Jesse Tyler Ferguson, Nick Jonas, Harvey Fierstein, Jack Falahee, and many ensemble members from the Broadway cast of Newsies''.

References

External links
 Official website
 Submissions Only on BroadwayWorld.com
 

American comedy web series
2010 web series debuts